Eino Leino is a 1978 studio album by Finnish musician Vesa-Matti Loiri.

The album has sold approximately 120,000 copies; it was certified gold and platinum in 1980, and double-platinum in 1985. It is considered to be Loiri's breakthrough album.

Track listing

References

1978 albums
Albums by Finnish artists